The red-faced mousebird (Urocolius indicus) is a species of mousebird or coly. It is a common in southern Africa from Zaire, Zambia  and Tanzania south to the  Cape. Its habitat is savanna with thickets, fynbos scrub, other open woodland, gardens and orchards.

This bird is about 34 cm (13 inches) long, with the tail comprising approximately half the length. The crested head and breast are pale cinnamon with a red bill and eye mask. The rest of the upperparts and tail are blue-grey apart from a paler grey rump. The belly is whitish. The sexes are similar, but juveniles lack the crest and have a green mask. Their call is tree-ree-ree whistle, and regularly called in multiple repetitions. Red-faced mousebirds make the same call whether in-flight or perched.

The red-faced mousebird is a frugivore which subsists on fruits, berries, leaves, seeds and nectar. Its flight is typically fast, strong and direct from one feeding area to another.

This is a social bird outside the breeding season, feeding together in small groups, normally of about half a dozen birds, but sometimes up to 15 or more. They fly and interact in tight collections. It engages in mutual preening and roosts in groups at night.  It is more wary than other mousebirds.

These sedentary birds breed between June to February. The nest is a large untidy cup of plant material lined with material such as sheep wool. The clutch is 2-6 eggs which hatch in about two weeks.

References 

 Ian Sinclair, Phil Hockey and Warwick Tarboton, SASOL Birds of Southern Africa (Struik 2002)

External links

 Red-faced mousebird - Species text in The Atlas of Southern African Birds.

Urocolius
Birds of Southern Africa
Birds described in 1790